The 2020 Armenian Supercup was the 23rd Armenian Supercup, an annual football match played between the winners of the previous season's Premier League, Ararat-Armenia, and the previous season's Armenian Cup, Noah, with the latter winning 2–1 after extra time.

Background

Noah won their 1st Armenian Cup title after beating Ararat-Armenia 7–6 on penalties after a 5–5 draw in final.

Ararat-Armenia won their second League title since their formation prior to the 2017–18 season.

Match details

See also
2019–20 Armenian Premier League
2019–20 Armenian Cup

Notes

References

Football in Armenia